{{Automatic taxobox
|image =  Dietzella zimmermanni (48749122072).jpg
|image_caption = Dietzella zimmermanni
|taxon = Dietzella
|authority = Champion, 1907
|synonyms = *Coelogaster Schoenherr, 1837 (Preocc.)Caelogaster Dietz, 1896 (Lapsus)
}}Dietzella is a genus of minute seed weevils in the beetle family Curculionidae. There are two described species in Dietzella.

Species
 Dietzella sextuberculata (Boheman, 1845)
 Dietzella zimmermanni'' (Gyllenhal, 1837)

References

Curculionidae
Articles created by Qbugbot